Califortalis is a genus of picture-winged flies in the family Ulidiidae.

Species
 C. hirsutifrons

References

Ulidiidae